tisco or TELCO may refer to:

 Telephone company, a provider of telecommunications services, such as telephony and data communications
 Telco, one of the companies that formed the Telecommunications Services of Trinidad and Tobago
 Telco Systems, a telecommunications systems manufacturer based in Mansfield, Massachusetts, USA
 TATA Engineering and Locomotive Company, an Indian automobile company firm